PSM Racing Line was a German auto racing team, who competed in the FIA Formula 3000 Championship.

History 
PSM Racing Line participated in the Formula 3000 season in 2002. The stable replaced the Prost Junior Team stable because it did not submit an application before the deadline.

Complete Formula 3000 results

References

External links
 Motorsportstats.com

German auto racing teams
International Formula 3000 teams
Auto racing teams established in 2002
Auto racing teams disestablished in 2002